The 1989 Individual Long Track World Championship was the 19th edition of the FIM speedway Individual Long Track World Championship. The event was held on 20 August 1989 at Mariánské Lázně in the Czech Republic which was Czechoslovakia at the time.

The world title was won by Simon Wigg of England for the second time.

Final Classification 

 E = eliminated (no further ride)
 f = fell
 ef = engine failure
 x = excluded

References 

1989
Speedway competitions in the Czech Republic
Sport in Czechoslovakia
Sports competitions in Czechoslovakia
Motor
Motor